Forsan Jr/Sr High School is a public high school located in Forsan, Texas, USA and classified as a 2A school by the UIL.  It is part of the Forsan Independent School District located in southwestern Howard County. In 2015, the school was rated "Met Standard" by the Texas Education Agency.

Athletics
The Forsan Buffaloes compete in these sports - 

Cross Country, Football, Basketball, Powerlifting, Golf, Tennis, Track, Softball & Baseball

State Titles
Boys Cross Country - 
2012(1A)
Girls Golf - 
1972(B)
Softball - 
2009 (1A), 2010(1A)

Band
UIL Marching Band State Champions under direction of: Jim Rhodes and Misty Moellendorf 
2007(1A)

The Forsan Buffalo Band was second in 2009 and sixth in 2011.

References

External links
Forsan ISD

Schools in Howard County, Texas
Public high schools in Texas
Public middle schools in Texas